Shipston is a surname. Notable people with the surname include:

Frank Shipston (1906–2005), English cricketer
Tui Shipston (born 1951), New Zealand former swimmer

English-language surnames